Kodimial is a village in Kodimial mandal of Jagtial district in the state of Telangana in India.

Geography
It has an average elevation of 387 meters (1272 feet).

References

Villages in Jagtial district
Mandal headquarters in Jagtial district